Litracen (N-7,049) is a tricyclic antidepressant which was never marketed.

See also 
 Fluotracen
 Melitracen

References 

Secondary amines
Anthracenes